The Bahraini King's Cup is a cup competition involving teams from the Bahraini Premier League and 2nd tier. Al-Muharraq SC are the current holders of the King's Cup, having defeated their arch-rivals Riffa S.C. on penalties in last year's final. They have won five of the past six editions of the tournament, with Riffa claiming the crown in between in 2010.

Draw
The official draw took place on 19 December 2013.

Preliminary round
The winners of the preliminary round qualify for the last 16 elimination round of the tournament.

1st round

2nd round

Quarter finals

Semi finals

Final

References

Bahraini King's Cup seasons
King's Cup
Bahrain